James Jefferson Myers (November 20, 1842 – April 13, 1915) was a U.S. lawyer and politician who served as the Speaker of the Massachusetts House of Representatives from 1900 to 1903.

Early life and education
Myers was born on his family's farm near Frewsberg, New York, he descended from Dutch and English ancestry.
Myers graduated from Harvard College in 1869, and from  Harvard Law School in 1872.

He died at his home in Cambridge on April 13, 1915.

See also
 121st Massachusetts General Court (1900)
 122nd Massachusetts General Court (1901)
 123rd Massachusetts General Court (1902)
 124th Massachusetts General Court (1903)

References

Speakers of the Massachusetts House of Representatives
1842 births
1915 deaths
Republican Party members of the Massachusetts House of Representatives
Massachusetts lawyers
American people of English descent
American people of Dutch descent
Harvard Law School alumni
People from Cambridge, Massachusetts
Harvard College alumni
19th-century American lawyers